The Peshawar Panthers was a domestic T20 and List A cricket team based in Peshawar, Khyber Pakhtunkhwa, Pakistan. The team was established in 2004 and its home ground was Arbab Niaz Stadium.

Winners
Peshawar Panthers won Haier T20 Cup 2014-15 beating Lahore Lions. Scoreboard: Cricinfo

Reserves

Former Notable Players

References

External links
Twenty 20 Record page for Peshawar Panthers
Cricketarchive page for Peshawar Panthers

Cricket clubs established in 2004
2004 establishments in Pakistan
Cricket teams in Pakistan
Sport in Peshawar